The 2008–09 season was the 109th season of competitive association football and 58th season in the Football League played by Shrewsbury Town Football Club, a professional football club based in Shrewsbury, Shropshire, England. Their eighteenth-place finish in 2007–08 meant it was their fifth consecutive season League Two. The season began on 1 July 2008 and concluded on 30 June 2009.

Paul Simpson, starting his first full season as Shrewsbury Town manager, made six permanent summer signings. They finished seventh in the table, and after beating Bury in the play-off semi-final, they lost 1–0 to Gillingham in the final at Wembley Stadium. Shrewsbury lost in their opening round matches in both the 2008–09 FA Cup and the League Cup, and were eliminated in the Southern section semi-final of the Football League Trophy.

32  players made at least one appearance in nationally organised first-team competition, and there were 17 different goalscorers. Grant Holt finished as leading scorer with 28 goals, of which 20 came in league competition, one came in the FA Cup and seven came in the Football League Trophy. Holt was recognised for his contribution to the season receiving the League Two Player of the Year award and was included in the PFA Team of the Year for League Two.

Match details

League Two

League table (part)

FA Cup

League Cup

League Trophy

League Two play-offs

Transfers

In

Out

Loans in

Squad
Source:
Numbers in parentheses denote appearances as substitute.
Players with squad numbers struck through and marked  left the club during the playing season.
Players with names in italics and marked * were on loan from another club for the whole of their season with Shrewsbury Town.
Key to positions: GK – Goalkeeper; DF – Defender; MF – Midfielder; FW – Forward

Notes

References

Shrewsbury Town F.C. seasons
Shrewsbury Town